Daily Azadi is a Bangladeshi newspaper published in Bangladesh.

History
The Azadi was first published on 5 September 1960. The paper was pro-democracy and supported various autonomy movements in East Pakistan. It was blacklisted by the Pakistani Government for a year and banned from receiving government advertisement. It stopped publishing for three months during the Bangladesh Liberation War.

Abdul Khaleq was the founding editor and publisher of Azadi. At first the price of the magazine was two annas (12 paise). After Khaleq's death, his son-in-law Md. Mohammad Khaled took over as editor in 1962. MA Malek has been in charge of the newspaper since 2003 after his death.

See also
 List of newspapers in Bangladesh

References

Newspapers established in 1960
English-language newspapers published in Bangladesh
1960 establishments in East Pakistan
Newspapers published in Chittagong
Daily newspapers published in Bangladesh